Rough Riding Ranger is a 1935 American Western film directed by Elmer Clifton.

Cast 
 Rex Lease as Ranger Corporal Daniels / Tombstone Kid
 Bobby Nelson as Bobby Francis
 Janet Chandler as Dorothy White
 Yakima Canutt as Henchman Draw
 Mabel Strickland as Mrs. Francis
 Sunday as Mrs. Francis' Horse
 David Horsley as Henchman Slim
 George Chesebro as Henchman Bald
 Robert D. Walker as Ram Hansen
 Carl Mathews as Cinch Clemmons
 Artie Ortego as Henchman Duce
 William Desmond as Major Wright
 Allen Greer as Rurales Lieutenant Ridriguez

External links 
 
 

1935 films
1930s English-language films
Films directed by Elmer Clifton
American black-and-white films
1935 Western (genre) films
American Western (genre) films
1930s American films